The closed elimia, scientific name †Elimia clausa, was a species of gastropod in the family Pleuroceridae. It was endemic to the United States. It is now extinct.

References

Elimia
Extinct gastropods
Gastropods described in 1861
Taxonomy articles created by Polbot